Marion K. Underwood is an American psychologist and dean of Purdue University's College of Health and Human Sciences, a position she assumed on August 1, 2018. She is a researcher in social aggression and is a fellow of the Association for Psychological Science.

Career
Underwood graduated from Wellesley College in 1986 and received her Ph.D. in clinical psychology from Duke University in 1991. She joined the faculty at Reed College in 1991, where she received tenure. From 1998 to 2018, she had various roles at the University of Texas at Dallas. In 2008, she was named to an Endowed Chair, as Ashbel Smith Professor. From 2015 to 2018, she served as dean of graduate studies and associate provost.

Her research has been funded by the National Institutes of Health since 1995. She studies social aggression (also known as relational aggression) in children and teens as well as adolescents' use of social media, text messaging, and other digital forms of communication. Her work has been seen on CNN, The New York Times, and The Atlantic, among others.

BlackBerry project
As part of a longitudinal study, Underwood provided free BlackBerrys to ninth-graders in exchange for permission to study the teens' text messages. On average, each student sent 1,321 text messages per month (about 43 per day). Underwood and her colleagues found that less than 2% of text messages had antisocial content (such as rule-breaking, drug use, physical aggression, or property crimes.) Many of the text messages included teens "building each other up" and providing support.

Selected works

Articles

Books

References

Living people
American women psychologists
Fellows of the Association for Psychological Science
Duke University alumni
Wellesley College alumni
Reed College faculty
Purdue University faculty
Year of birth missing (living people)
American women academics
21st-century American women
American child psychologists